Running on Empty or Runnin' on Empty  may refer to:

Running on Empty (album), an album by Jackson Browne
"Running on Empty" (song), the title song
Running on Empty (1982 film), an Australian film directed by John Clark
Running on Empty (1988 film), an American film directed by Sidney Lumet
Running on Empty (2006 film), a 2006 German film
Running on Empty (novel),  a Hardy Boys Casefiles novel
"Running on Empty", a song by UFO from Walk on Water
Runnin' on Empty Vol. 1 and Vol. 2, albums by The Mummies